This article lists events from the year 2016 in Peru.

Incumbents
 President: Ollanta Humala (until 28 July) Pedro Pablo Kuczynski (from 28 July)
 First Vice President: Marisol Espinoza (until 28 July) Martín Vizcarra (from 28 July) 
 Second Vice President: Omar Chehade (until 28 July) Mercedes Aráoz (from 28 July)
 Prime Minister: Pedro Cateriano (until 28 July) Fernando Zavala Lombardi (from 28 July)

Events
10 April – 2016 Peruvian general election
28 July – Pedro Pablo Kuczynski took over as president

Publications

Poetry 
 Rossella Di Paolo: La silla en el mar (The chair in the sea).

Novel 
 Isabel Sabogal: Un Universo dividido (A divided Universe).

Anthology 
 Ricardo Silva Santisteban (anthologist): Antología general de la traducción en el Perú (General anthology of translation in Peru), volume VII.

Cinema 
 Extirpator of Idolatries by Manuel Siles.
 Videophilia (and Other Viral Syndromes) by Juan Daniel F. Molero.

Sport 
5-21 August – Peru at the 2016 Summer Olympics: 29 competitors in 11 sports

Deaths
17 February – Eduardo Chirinos, poet (b. 1960).

26 February – Juan Conway McNabb, Roman Catholic bishop (b. 1925).

6 March – María Rostworowski, historian (b. 1915).

References

Links

 
2010s in Peru
Years of the 21st century in Peru
Peru
Peru